The Old Mill Toronto is an event venue with a boutique hotel, spa and restaurant, in The Kingsway neighbourhood of Toronto, Ontario, Canada. It includes facilities for business meetings, conferences, celebrations and weddings, with an on-site chapel and wedding garden. Its restaurant has served afternoon tea since it opened in 1914 and serves Sunday family brunch and dinner buffets.

The facility is located on Old Mill Road north of Bloor Street, just west of the Humber River. The Old Mill subway station is a short distance away.

History

The Old Mill is near the site of Toronto's first sawmill, built c. 1793. A series of mill complexes were built on the site and destroyed by fire.  The last one was built in 1848 by William Tyrell and burned down in 1881.

The Old Mill Tea Garden restaurant was founded by Robert Home Smith in 1914, next to the ruins of an old grist mill on the Humber River. It was part of the Kingsway residential development by Smith.

Over the ensuing decades, 16 banquet rooms were added. In the 1980s, a wedding chapel was built in the old grist mill's ruins. A hotel and spa opened in October 2001, with 45 rooms and 13 suites. The addition cost approximately  million to build.

The Tea Garden was a place for dancing to big band music in the 1920s, and still today this tradition carries on. It was designated as a heritage property in 1983 by the former city of Etobicoke and retains that designation with Toronto. An historical plaque of Étienne Brûlé is near the main entrance.

It has changed owners three times, and was bought by the Kalmar family in 1991. In 2015, the property was sold to OMT Hospitality.

References

External links
 

Hotels in Toronto
City of Toronto Heritage Properties
1914 establishments in Ontario